Brown-eyed soul, also referred to as Chicano soul, is soul music performed in the United States mainly by Hispanic Latinos and Chicanos in Southern California, East Los Angeles, and San Antonio (Texas) during the 1960s, continuing through to the early 1980s. The trend of Latinos started with Latino rock and roll and rock musicians. "Brown eyed soul" contrasts with blue-eyed soul, soul music performed by non-Hispanic white artists.

History
Critic Ruben Molina said roots of chicano soul music was from the 1950s jazz, blues, doo wop, jump blues, latin jazz, rock, ranchera, norteno, and conjunto music in the West Coast, Texas Latino communities. Latino artists began to draw inspiration from African American R&B hits, and as a result, Latino soul began sounding very similar to African American soul music. Early artists owed little to traditional Latino and rarely performed in Spanish.

Hispanic rock singer Ritchie Valens, also became one of the first artists to bring traditional music and rock and roll. Valens recorded "Donna", " La Bamba", "Come On, Let's Go", and "Donna" reached #2 on Billboard pop chart in 1959. 

1960s and 1970s bands such as Cannibal & the Headhunters ("Land of a Thousand Dances") and Thee Midniters played R&B music with a rebellious rock and roll edge. Sunny and the Sunliners were popular in the 1960s. 

However, the large Latino population on the West Coast began gradually moving away from energetic R&B to romantic soul, and the results were "some of the sweetest soul music heard during the late '60s and '70s."  Latino groups on the West Coast and Texas also drew from the doo wop-influenced Philadelphia soul ("Philly" soul). The West Coast Latin rock scene continued to influence other Latino soul musicians as well. Tierra gained the top 40 hit "Together".

Brown-eyed soul artists
Cannibal & the Headhunters 
Frankie J
Paula DeAnda
Jennifer Lopez
Malo
Thee Midniters
The Premiers
Sam the Sham & the Pharaohs
Sheila E
Sunny and the Sunliners
Tierra
War

See also
 Latin rock
 Tejano music
 Carlos Santana
 Chicano rock
 Chicano rap
 Lowrider
 Yacht soul

Notes

1980s in music
1970s in Latin music
1960s in Latin music
Soul music
Hispanic American music